Fulham Gardens is a western suburb of Adelaide, South Australia in the City of Charles Sturt.

Geography
The suburb is on Tapleys Hill Road, with Grange Road as its northern boundary.

Demographics

The 2006 census by the Australian Bureau of Statistics counted 5,942 persons in Fulham Gardens on census night. Of these, 49% were male and 51% were female.

The majority of residents (67.7%) are of Australian birth, with other common census responses being Italy (8.8%), Greece (5.6%) and England (3.2%).

The age distribution of Fulham Gardens residents is skewed higher than the greater Australian population. 72.9% of residents were over 25 years in 2006, compared to the Australian average of 66.5%; and 29.1% were younger than 25 years, compared to the Australian average of 33.5%.

Politics

Local government
Fulham Gardens is part of Henley and Findon wards in the City of Charles Sturt local government area, being represented in that council by Jim Fitzpatrick and Robert Randall (Henley) and by Doriana Coppola and Joe Ienco (Findon).

State and federal
Fulham Gardens lies in the state electoral district of Colton and the federal electoral division of Adelaide. The suburb is represented in the South Australian House of Assembly by Paul Caica and federally by Steve Georganas.

Facilities and attractions

Shopping and dining
A shopping centre is located on Tapleys Hill Road with a Drakes, Chemist, Bakery and other small stores.

Parks
As well as a small portion of Torrens Linear Park in the southeast, there are several small parks and reserves scattered thought the suburb.

Fulham Gardens shares Collins Reserve with neighbouring Kidman Park.

Transportation

Roads
Fulham Gardens is serviced by Tapleys Hill Road, bisecting the suburb from north to south, and Grange Road, connecting the suburb to Adelaide city centre and the coast.

Public transport
Fulham Gardens is serviced by public transport run by the Adelaide Metro.

Buses
The suburb is serviced by the following bus routes:
300
110, 112
287, 288
H30
H33

See also
 List of Adelaide suburbs

References

External links

Suburbs of Adelaide